Radio SOMA is a Russian-language musical FM radio station based in Abkhazia. It is Abkhazia's only independent radio station.

History
The first broadcast started on 31 December 1997. Radio SOMA was founded by Zurab Ajinjal, who first had the idea to launch the station in 1997.

Broadcasts
The station broadcasts usually 24 hours a day on 107.9 MHz in Abkhazia. The studio of Radio SOMA is located in a building of the Abkhazian State University.

Radio SOMA is a partner of Voice of Russia.

Radio SOMA is a partner of Conciliation Resources in their South Caucasus Radio Diaries project.

In 2004 Radio SOMA prepared the cd Абхазия – взгляд изнутри (Abkhazia – A Look Inside) meant to describe today's life in Abkhazia.

External links
Radio SOMA official site

References

Radio stations in Abkhazia
Mass media in Sukhumi